Unchukatl is a rural locality (a selo) and the administrative centre of Unchukatlinsky Selsoviet, Laksky District, Republic of Dagestan, Russia. The population was 451 as of 2010. There are 10 streets.

Geography 
Unchukatl is located 9 km northeast of Kumukh (the district's administrative centre) by road. Karasha and Kamasha are the nearest rural localities.

Nationalities 
Laks live there.

Famous residents 
 Zagidi Mamayev (Doctor of Technical Sciences, Professor, Member of the Russian Engineering Academy, Laureate of the USSR Council of Ministers Prize)

References 

Rural localities in Laksky District